Petar Krstić, known as Petar Koćura (Петар Коћура) was a member of the Serbian Chetnik Organization. He belonged to the Deda-Stojkovci family in Koćura near Vranje. During the office of Alimpije Marjanović as Chief of the Mountainous Headquarters (1908), the notable regional commanders (vojvode) were Koćura, Todor Krstić-Algunjski, Vasilije Trbić, Petko Nagorički, Vojislav Tankosić, Vojin Popović and others.

See also
 List of Chetnik voivodes

References

Sources

Chetniks of the Macedonian Struggle
20th-century Serbian people
People from Vranje